The ARIA Music Award for Highest Selling Album was an award presented at the annual ARIA Music Awards. It was presented from 1987 through to 2011.

John Farnham holds the record for the most wins, at five (1987, 1989, 1991, 1994, 1999) as well as his involvement in The Australian Cast Recording win in 1993.

Winners and nominees
In the following table, the winner is highlighted in a separate colour, and in boldface; the nominees are those that are not highlighted or in boldface.

References

External links

 

 
Highest Selling Album
Album awards